Cagayan River, often called the Cagayan de Oro River, is one of the rivers draining the northern central part of the island of Mindanao in the Philippines. The river has its headwaters in the Kalatungan Mountain Range and Kitanglad Mountain Range found in the central part of the province of Bukidnon. It traverses the municipalities of Talakag, Baungon and Libona, connecting tributaries along the way. It finally empties into the Macajalar Bay at Cagayan de Oro in the province of Misamis Oriental.

The river serves as the natural boundary between the province of Bukidnon and Iligan and between Bukidnon and Cagayan de Oro, based on the administrative order issued by the defunct Department of Mindanao and Sulu during the American occupation of the Philippines. In Cagayan de Oro, it is the dividing line between its two Congressional districts.

The Cagayan River is a very popular site for whitewater rafting in the Philippines and has been promoted by the Department of Tourism as the main tourist attraction of Cagayan de Oro.

Etymology 

The original name of the river is Kalambaguasasahan River, because of the presence of  Lambago trees (Hibiscus tiliaceus, a member of the Malvaceae tree family that only thrives in low altitude areas like seashores, riverbanks and other areas reached by tidal streams) along the river banks. During the arrival of the Spaniards in Cagayan de Oro, the name was changed to Cagayan River.

The name of the river Cagayan comes from the Malayo-Polynesian word "Ag", which means water. "Kagay" means river and "Kagayan" is place with a river.

Geography

Course 

The river's headwaters is found in the Kalatungan Mountain Range, in the central portion of the province of Bukidnon. It flows northward towards Cagayan de Oro for about  before emptying into the Macajalar Bay.

Drainage Area 

About 80% of the drainage basin is located in the Province of Bukidnon and the rest is in Iligan and Cagayan de Oro.

Tributaries 

The main tributaries of the Cagayan de Oro River are the following:

 Kalawaig River
 Tagite River
 Bubunaoan River
 Tumalaong River

Mouth 

The river's mouth is located in Cagayan de Oro. After a  course from the mountains of Bukidnon, the river finally discharges its load to the Macajalar Bay.

Tourism

Whitewater rafting and kayaking 

Whitewater rafting, kayaking and river trekking has been one of the tourism activities being promoted in the river. The city administration and the Department of Tourism made it as the banner tourism activity in Cagayan de Oro. The jump-off point of the river, whitewater rafting is at Barangay Mambuaya, a 30-40 minute ride from the city proper.

Recently, whitewater rafting in the Cagayan River is gaining popularity through the years after President Gloria Macapagal Arroyo and other famous personalities in the country have tried the challenging whitewater rafting in the river.

Fishery
In the lower reaches of the stream, this low catch of smaller immature fish is evidence of lack of management of the fishery. Less than 1% to as much as 10% of the local population may be engaged at least part-time as fishermen, most are men. Full-time fishermen earn about US$1,000 to 2,000 per year, which is below the poverty line. Gill nets, cast nets, long lines, fish hooks and line sets, spears, traps and traditional fishing boats are used. The catch includes Snapper (Aha-an), Flagtail (Aligaman), Crab (Alimango), Red-tailed goby (Anga), Squaretail mullet (Balanak), Goby (Batinga), Silver perch (Bugaong), Otomebora Mullet (Bunak), Indo-Pacific Tarpon (Buwan-buwan), Loach goby (Dalapakan), Mountain bass (Damagan), Indian pellona (Ibis), Flathead grey mullet (Gisaw), Gourami (Gurami), Mudfish (Halu-an), Shrimp (Hipon, Goby (Iswil), Carp (Karpa), Eel (Kasili), Spotted Scat (Kikilo), Mullet (Muli), Cyprinidae (Pait), Catfish (Pantat), Rock goby (Pigok), Mangrove red snapper (Tadlungan), Tilapia.

See also 

 Cagayan de Oro
 Macajalar Bay
 Bukidnon

References 

Rivers of the Philippines
Landforms of Misamis Oriental
Landforms of Bukidnon
Tourist attractions in Cagayan de Oro